The Dutch Windmill is the northern of two functioning windmills, the other being Murphy Windmill, on the western edge of Golden Gate Park in San Francisco, California. It was completed in 1903, and placed on the San Francisco Designated Landmark list on December 6, 1981.

History
In the 1870s and 1880s, Golden Gate Park was planted on sand dunes and required substantial irrigation. In 1902, the  Park Commission authorized the construction of two windmills to pump groundwater for park irrigation rather than purchasing water at exorbitant costs from the Spring Valley Water Company. The Dutch Mill was completed one year later and pumped 30,000 gallons per hour.

Electric water pumps replaced the need for windmills in 1913, and the mill fell into disrepair. By the 1950s, the mill was in a state of ruin.

Restoration
In 1964, the San Francisco Citizens Commission for the Restoration of the Golden Gate Park Windmills was formed and led by Eleanor Rossi Crabtree, daughter of former San Francisco mayor Angelo Rossi. The windmill was restored in 1981. The Queen Wilhelmina Tulip Garden is located next to the Dutch Mill.

See also
 List of windmills in the United States

References

External links
 
 San Francisco Recreation & Parks Departmentkings day

Golden Gate Park
Buildings and structures in San Francisco
Windmills in California
Windmills completed in 1903
1900s architecture in the United States
San Francisco Designated Landmarks
Agricultural buildings and structures in California
1903 establishments in California
Wind power in California